USS Leyte (CV/CVA/CVS-32, AVT-10) was one of 24 s built during and shortly after World War II for the United States Navy. The ship was the third US Navy ship to bear the name. Leyte was commissioned in April 1946, too late to serve in World War II. She spent most of her career in the Atlantic, Caribbean, and Mediterranean, but also saw service in the Korean War, in which she earned two battle stars. She was reclassified in the early 1950s as an attack carrier (CVA), then as an Antisubmarine Aircraft Carrier (CVS), and finally (after inactivation) as an aircraft transport (AVT).

Unlike most of her sister ships, Leyte received no major modernizations, and thus throughout her career retained the classic appearance of a World War II Essex-class ship. She was decommissioned in 1959 and sold for scrap in 1970.

Construction and commissioning
Leyte was one of the "long-hull"  ships. She was laid down as Crown Point on 21 February 1944 at the Newport News Shipbuilding & Dry Dock Co., Newport News, Virginia, and renamed Leyte on 8 May 1945 to commemorate the recent Battle of Leyte Gulf. She was launched on 23 August, sponsored by Mrs. James M. Mead, and commissioned on 11 April 1946, with Captain Henry F. MacComsey in command.

Service history

Leyte joined battleship  on a good will cruise along the western seaboard of South America in the fall of 1946 before returning to the Caribbean on 18 November to resume shakedown operations. In 1948, the carrier was equipped with its first helicopter detachment of HO3S-1 utility helicopters, and participated in a fleet exercise, Operation Frigid, in the North Atlantic. In the years preceding the Korean War, the Leyte participated in numerous other fleet exercises in the Atlantic and Caribbean, trained naval reservists, and deployed three times to the Mediterranean: April–June 1947, July–November 1947, September 1949 – January 1950, and May–August 1950. The latter included a demonstration of airpower over Beirut, Lebanon  on 13 August, supporting the Middle East against Communist pressure. Leyte returned to Norfolk on 24 August, and after 2 weeks of preparation, departed on 6 September to join Task Force 77 (TF 77) in the Far East to support United Nations Forces in Korea.

Leyte arrived at the Sasebo base for U.S. Fleet Activities in Sasebo, Japan, on 8 October 1950 and made final preparations for combat operations. From 9 October – 19 January 1951, the ship and her aircraft spent 92 days at sea and flew 3,933 sorties against North Korean forces. Her pilots accumulated 11,000 hours in the air while inflicting massive damage upon enemy positions, supplies, transportation, and communications. Among the squadrons based on Leyte were the VF-32 Swordsmen, flying the F4U Corsair. This squadron included the first African-American naval aviator, Ensign Jesse LeRoy Brown, who was killed in action on 4 December 1950. Leyte returned to Norfolk for overhaul 25 February 1951.

After fleet training exercises in the Caribbean terminated on 21 August, the carrier departed for her fifth tour of duty with the United States Sixth Fleet on 3 September. She returned to Norfolk on 21 December for operations out of Hampton Roads, and again steamed for the Mediterranean on 29 August 1952. Reclassified CVA-32 on 1 October, she returned to Boston on 16 February 1953 for deactivation. On 8 August, however, she was ordered to be retained in the active fleet, and, redesignated CVS-32 on the same day, work was begun converting her to an ASW carrier.

At 15:15 on 16 October 1953, while still under conversion to an antisubmarine carrier, Leyte suffered an explosion in her port catapult machinery room. Within minutes, naval base and city fire trucks were on the scene. After a hard and gallant fight, the fire was extinguished at 19:57. As a result of the fire, 37 men died and 28 were injured.

Conversion completed on 4 January 1954, Leyte departed Boston for Quonset Point, Rhode Island, as flagship of Carrier Division 18 (CarDiv 18). She remained there for the next five years conducting ASW tactical operations along the eastern seaboard and in the Caribbean.

Leyte departed Quonset Point in January 1959 for the New York Navy Yard where she commenced preinactivation overhaul. She was redesignated AVT-10 and decommissioned both on 15 May 1959, and was assigned to the Philadelphia group of the Atlantic Reserve Fleet, where she remained until sold for scrap in September 1970 and completed in Chesapeake, Virginia.

Awards
Navy Unit Commendation
World War II Victory Medal 
Navy Occupation Service Medal (Europe clasp) 
National Defense Service Medal
Korean Service Medal (2 battle stars) 
United Nations Korean Medal 
Republic of Korea War Service Medal (retroactive)

Gallery

External links

Navy photographs of Leyte (CV-32)
Leyte Association Website
Photos of Leyte – NavSource Online

References

Essex-class aircraft carriers
Ships built in Newport News, Virginia
1945 ships
World War II aircraft carriers of the United States
Cold War aircraft carriers of the United States
Korean War aircraft carriers of the United States
Ship fires
Maritime incidents in 1953